Bathyagonus is a genus of poachers (bottom-dwelling cold-water marine fish) native to the Pacific Ocean.

Species
There are currently four recognized species in this genus:
 Bathyagonus alascanus (C. H. Gilbert, 1896) (Gray starsnout)
 Bathyagonus infraspinatus (C. H. Gilbert, 1904) (Spinycheek starsnout)
 Bathyagonus nigripinnis C. H. Gilbert, 1890 (Blackfin poacher)
 Bathyagonus pentacanthus (C. H. Gilbert, 1890) (Bigeye poacher)

References

Bathyagoninae